Stegopterna mutata, the mutated black fly, is a species of black flies (insects in the family Simuliidae).

References

Simuliidae
Articles created by Qbugbot
Insects described in 1914